Xinjiekou station is an interchange station between Line 1 and Line 2 of the Nanjing Metro. It is located in Xinjiekou, the central business and commercial district of Nanjing. The largest and busiest station in the system, Xinjiekou station has 25 officially marked exits. On 30 September 2016 the station served a peak volume of 130,500 passengers. Trains here stop for 55 seconds, the longest stop at a non-terminus station in a mainland Chinese metro system.

Opening dates
The interchange with line 2 opened along with the opening of the entire line on 28 May 2010.

Gallery

References

External links

Railway stations in Jiangsu
Nanjing Metro stations
Railway stations in China opened in 2005